Mappy is a 1983 arcade game.

Mappy may also refer to:

The Mappy franchise, which includes:
Mappy-Land
Hopping Mappy
Mappy Kids
Teku-Teku Mappy

See also
Map (disambiguation)